Chris Tolos (December 5, 1929 – August 13, 2005) was a Canadian professional wrestler.

Early life
Chris was the oldest of the three children born on December 5, 1929 to Greek parents, Nicolaos and Evangelia (Evangeline) Tolos, in Hamilton, Ontario where he and his brother John played football, hockey, lacrosse and track, and learned to wrestle. Chris got into professional wrestling via Wee Willie Davis and made his debut in Buffalo around 1951.

Wrestling career
Chris debuted as a heel at first, losing preliminary bouts to such performers as Johnny Barend, Sandor Kovacs and Don Beitelman (Curtis), all of whom he would fight many times over the years.

He soon formed a team with his brother John. They held numerous tag titles, including the WWWF U.S. tag titles in 1963, the NWA World tag titles in Florida in 1964 and in Detroit that same year, the World and Canadian tag titles in Vancouver in 1967 and the Pacific Coast tag belts in California in 1953.

In 1972, Chris went to Los Angeles and teamed with John as babyfaces, against Black Gordman and Goliath, one of his few stints as a babyface.

In the late 1960s he feuded with Iron Mike Dibiase in Omaha, and was a contender for the NWA World title.

Death
Chris Tolos died of cancer on Friday, August 13, 2005. His brother and tag team partner John died in May 2009.

Championships and accomplishments
American Wrestling Association
AWA Midwest Tag Team Championship (1 time) - with Stan Pulaski
Big Time Wrestling
NWA World Tag Team Championship (Detroit version) (1 time) - with John Tolos
Championship Wrestling from Florida
NWA World Tag Team Championship (Florida version) (1 time) - with John Tolos
Maple Leaf Wrestling
NWA International Tag Team Championship (Toronto version) (3 times) - with John Tolos
NWA All-Star Wrestling
NWA Canadian Tag Team Championship (Vancouver version) (2 times) - with John Tolos
NWA World Tag Team Championship (Vancouver version) (2 times) - with John Tolos
Professional Wrestling Hall of Fame and Museum
Class of 2007 - Inducted as a member of the Canadian Wrecking Crew (with John Tolos)
Stampede Wrestling
NWA International Tag Team Championship (Calgary version) (1 time) - with John Tolos
World Wide Wrestling Federation
WWWF United States Tag Team Championship (1 time) - with John Tolos

Notes

1929 births
2005 deaths
20th-century professional wrestlers
Canadian male professional wrestlers
Canadian people of Greek descent
Professional wrestlers from Hamilton, Ontario
Professional Wrestling Hall of Fame and Museum
Stampede Wrestling alumni
NWA World Tag Team Champions (Florida version)
NWA International Tag Team Champions (Toronto version)
Stampede Wrestling International Tag Team Champions